Mauro García Juncal (born 21 May 1971) in a Spanish retired footballer who could play as a right back or midfielder.

Career

Mauro García was born in Moaña, in the province of Pontevedra in Galicia, and began his career with Pontevedra CF. He played for Pontevedra in Segunda División B for six years, from 1989 to 1995, before taking the step up to La Liga with Compostela. He spent three seasons in the top flight with Compostela, until they were relegated after losing a playoff at the end of the 1997–98 season. He continued to represent Compostela for the following two seasons in the Segunda División, before returning to the top division with Rayo Vallecano in 2000. He participated in the sole European campaign in Rayo's history during his first season, making his European debut in a 1–0 away win over Molde of Norway in the UEFA Cup first round on 14th September.

Rayo were relegated in 2002–03, and Mauro left the club that summer to rejoin his first club, Pontevedra. Pontevedra were promoted via the playoffs after winning their Segunda División B group in 2003–04, but were relegated again after just one season in the second tier. Mauro retired at the end of the 2005–06 season, having just passed his 35th birthday.

Honours
Pontevedra
Segunda División B: 2003–04

Career statistics

1. Appearances in the 1995 Segunda División B playoffs
2. Appearances in the 1997–98 La Liga relegation playoff
3. Appearances in the 2000–01 UEFA Cup
4. Appearances in the 2004 Segunda División B playoffs

References

External links

1971 births
Living people
Spanish footballers
Footballers from Moaña
Association football defenders
Association football midfielders
La Liga players
Segunda División players
Segunda División B players
Pontevedra CF footballers
SD Compostela footballers
Rayo Vallecano players